Werner Arnold (14 June 1930 – 1 February 2005) was a Swiss professional racing cyclist. He rode in the 1956 Tour de France.

References

External links
 

1930 births
2005 deaths
Swiss male cyclists
Sportspeople from Basel-Stadt